WTW may stand for:

 Wakefield Trinity Wildcats, a rugby club based in Wakefield, England
 "Walk This Way", a song by Aerosmith
 Water treatment works
 Well-to-wheel, an analysis of fuel consumption
 Willis Towers Watson, a global multinational risk management, insurance brokerage and advisory company
 Wine to Water, a non-profit organization
 What3words, a geocode system designed to identify locations using words